Émile Counord station is located on line  of the tramway de Bordeaux.

Junctions
There are no junctions with other lines or buses at this station.

Close by

See also
 TBC
 Tramway de Bordeaux

Bordeaux tramway stops
Tram stops in Bordeaux
Railway stations in France opened in 2007